The Arie Livne Jewish cultural center is a cultural center in the town of Banja Luka in Bosnia and Herzegovina. Inaugurated in 2014, it is the only such facility built after the Second World War in the Balkans. The cultural center is used for the affirmation of Jewish culture, history and tradition. It includes a religious centre - the Ilona Weiss synagogue - as well as shops, coffee bars, and private spaces. 

The Jewish cultural center is named after Arie Livne, friend of Republika Srpska's President Milorad Dodik, who named him as Representative of Republika Srpska in Israel. In 2017 it was revealed that the office is registered as a private company in Israel, despite having received nearly one million Bosnian Marks in public subsidies.  Livne was later declared as persona non grata in Israel, and Dodik threatened to cut off all relations between Republika Srpska and Israel because of this.

The Synagogue which is part of the Jewish cultural centre is named after the mother of Arie Livne, Ilona Weiss, who during World War II was murdered in Auschwitz. This is one of the two synagogues in the territory of the Republic of Srpska, the other being located in Doboj.

The first Days of Israel and Jewish culture were organised at the Arie Livne Jewish cultural center in 2015.

History of Jews in Banja Luka 

Sephardi Jews were first mentioned in Banja Luka in the 16th century. Till the Austro-Hungarian time, the Jewish population of Banja Luka was exclusively of Sephardi Jews, originating from Spain and Portugal. They were into crafts and trade; crafts are practiced by the poorer Jews while those somewhat better off were into trade. Since 1878, Jews have given great impetus expansion of the capitalist economy and the spread of Western European ideas in Banja Luka. According to data from 1815 to 1878, holders of import-export trade were Serbs, Jews, and Muslims are oriented towards the internal trade and handicrafts. 
 
Ashkenazi also settled in town in the 19th century. Before World War II, Banja Luka's Jewish Community consisted of a few hundred families. They were nearly all wiped out during the Holocaust in Yugoslavia. 
Today the number of Jewish families in Banja Luka is in the order of tens.

References

External links 
 Jewish Cultural Center
 Banja Luka receives the Jewish Cultural Center
 Days of Israel and Jewish culture in Banja Luka
 Jewish Community of Banja Luka

Jewish Bosnian history
Synagogues in Bosnia and Herzegovina